The Our Lady of Remedies Parish, also known as Malate Church, is a parish church in the district of Malate in the city of Manila, Philippines. This Mexican Baroque-style church is overlooking Plaza Rajah Sulayman and, ultimately, Manila Bay. A revered statue of the Virgin Mary in her role as Our Lady of Remedies was brought from Spain in 1624 and stands at the altar.

Malate used to be known as Maalat due to the saline waters of the bay; and as Laguio or Lagunoi, the name of the street which separated it from Ermita. It is located by Manila Bay, very close to the sea. One main street crosses it at the center. It is wide and beautiful and leads up to Cavite. The numerous trees make this road a pleasant walk. It lies just three kilometers from the center of Manila.

Foundation

The Augustinian Chapter held on 18 September 1581 accepted the house of Maalat as a house of the Order under the name of Lagunoi and the advocation of the Conception of Our Lady (Immaculate Conception). In the Chapter held on 17 May 1590, three resident priests of the monastery of San Agustin (Manila) were charged with the care of the natives of Malate; they were Frs. Alfonso de Castro, Diego Munoz and Ildefonso Gutierrez. The report of the Father Provincial of 1591 reveals that the house of Malate together with Lagunoi has 1,200 persons, convent and church. In 1639, the convent of Malate contributed to the patriotic campaign of Governor-General Sebastián Hurtado de Corcuera, former governor of Panama, who brought Peruvian soldiers to fight against pirates, with a donation of two bells of seven arrobas and seven libras (154 kg. & 220 g.).

In 1624, Fr. Juan de Guevara brought from Andalucía, Spain, the image of the Virgen de los Remedios which was said to be miraculous. It "had graceful features," says San Agustin, "was half vara high (417 mm.) and slightly brown." Fr. Castro's version is different. "I saw the image a thousand times," writes Castro, "but she never looked brown to me, but rather white with hands and face of white ivory." The devotion to the Virgen de los Remedios made Malate a very famous sanctuary. People flocked to venerate the image, especially on Saturdays. Women presented their babies to the Virgin.

Except for a short time, Malate was always administered by the Augustinians. The priest of Malate also administered the town of Ermita from 1591 to 1610, since the two barrios had been united by Governor-General Gómez Pérez Dasmariñas with the approval of Bishop Domingo de Salazar, O.P. Pasay separated from Malate under the name of Pineda on 17 May 1863. Malate was also a place of recreation for the residents of the Walled City and a meeting place for noblemen, Tagalogs and their kings like Rajah Matanda and Rajah Soliman. It easily became "the most aristocratic barrio of Manila where Spaniards and mestizos dwelt."

Construction 
In 1591, Malate had only one church and one convent. The church and convent dedicated to the Nativity of Our Lady (Conception) were damaged heavily by the 1645 Luzon earthquake. San Agustin describes the latter as "a magnificent work of arches and stone." Then in 1667, both structures were destroyed on orders of Gov. Sabiniano Manrique de Lara due to the threat posed by the pirate Koxinga.

In 1669, the father provincial placed the convent of Malate under his immediate care and authorized the prior to use the "repository of alms for the dead" for the construction of the buildings. Fr. Dionisio Suarez began the construction of a new church (the second one) and convent made of bricks and stone in 1677–1679. It was completed by Fr. Pedro de Mesa in 1680.

In 1721, the convent was in ruinous condition, and the coffers of the house empty. The father provincial sent a circular to the various ministries of the Tagalogs available. Furthermore, the convent was relieved of the obligation to pay rent to San Agustin Monastery. The money raised amounted only to 400 pesos, just enough to buy the materials. The construction work proceeded very slowly because the prior depended almost completely on funds of the provincial.

In 1762 during the British occupation of Manila, the British occupied the church and turned it into their headquarters. Serious damage was inflicted on the structure. There are no records as to who restored the buildings after the British had taken leave. A typhoon occurred on 3 June 1868 which destroyed the church.

Fr. Francisco Cuadrado constructed the third church, the present one, in 1864 almost in its entirety except for the facade. Fr. Francisco Cuadrado, then the parish priest, started the reconstruction. The "just one," as he was called by his parishioners, toured the city and nearby provinces to raise the necessary funds. His efforts paid off and he apparently got more than what he needed. Thus, he was known for gathering the poor fishermen of his parish and sharing with them his "savings."

There was some restoration work which was headed by Fr. Nicolas Dulanto who was also responsible for the completion of the upper part of the facade between 1894 and 1898. The next decades saw the church attract more devotees. But when the holocaust of 1945 came, the church and convent ended up in complete ruins and the records were also burned to ashes.

During the Japanese occupation, both the church and the convent were burned down leaving only the walls. The Japanese had earlier taken away Fathers Kelly, Henaghan, Monaghan, and Fallon, plus other parishioners, never to be seen again. Rebuilding of the church was undertaken by the Columban Fathers during the 1950s. They rebuilt the roof, the altar, the dome and the transept while the interior was painted, and the bricks and the stone outside were returned to their pristine color in 1978.

The old convent was demolished in 1929. Fr. Gary Cogan built a new one in 1930. One of the remaining bells displayed at the entrance of the new convent has this inscription: "Nuestra Senora de los Remedios. Se fundio en 30 de Enero de 1879."

Architecture 
Malate Church is one of only two that has twisted columns and has in effect a retablo-type façade, the other being the Franciscan church in Daraga.

If Santa Ana was the summer resort by the Pasig River from the 17th to the 19th centuries, Malate was its counterpart by Manila Bay. Seaside villas beautified the place as a virtual college town emerged, with St. Scholastica's College and De La Salle College on the south, University of the Philippines and Ateneo Municipal on Padre Faura Street on the north and some, other private schools within the boundaries of the college town.

Malate Church was considered to be a dangerous stronghold if captured by enemy forces, as stone churches outside Intramuros can be a convenient cover. When the British occupied Manila in 1762 they operated from the church's tower and Manila was subsequently sacked.

Exterior 

There is interplay of Muslim design and Mexican Baroque. Says one writer, "it is in the design of the facade where the significance of the Malate Church lies." The juxtaposition of Mexican Baroque and Muslim design has resulted in an interesting colonial style, "mudejarisimo Filipino," in the words of Alice Coseteng in her book, Spanish Churches in the Philippines.

The central rectangular body of the three-storey façade is flanked by two projecting cylindrical buttresses, shaped into half-embedded hexagonal forms and converted into belltowers by employing the third tier as belfries. The embellishments on the stone surface are worked onto the natural surface, making it appear as if the ornamental designs had emerged on the surface as a holistic part of the design. The Augustinian symbol, the flaming heart, is carved on both sides of the entrance. Bells hang from the uppermost part of the cylindrical side buttresses. The illusion of solidity and height are from the twisted columns, which is a popular feature in Mexican baroque and used extensively in retablos but seldom on facades. The combination of Romanesque columns on the first storey, the twisted columns on the second, and the blind balusters are clearly baroque. The presence of the plain pediment suggests a Renaissance style of architecture.

The design of the church façade is unusual with the use of trefoil blind arches which clearly indicate an influence of the Moorish art. The large opening of the lower level is balanced by the blind trefoil openings of the second and the semi-circular niche of the third. Laid out across the tiers like cornices are diamond and rectangular designs, as well as the shallow, ornamental relief work which suggest Muslim art. Few openings suggest massiveness in the design. The attached bell towers give an impression of solidity and strength by their massiveness which tries to squeeze the middle part of the façade.

Interior 
Enshrined in the main altar is an image of Our Lady of Remedios. It was brought from Spain by the Augustinians who were administering the church in the 16th century. This image is popular with the mothers who have sick children; they manifest their devotion by lighting special candles and pouring forth their private petitions.

Gallery

References

External links

 Website of Malate Church
 Coordinates

Roman Catholic churches in Manila
Baroque architecture in the Philippines
Cultural Properties of the Philippines in Metro Manila
Buildings and structures in Malate, Manila
Churches in the Roman Catholic Archdiocese of Manila